Shooting at the 2015 Pacific Games was held from 6–11 July at the June Valley Shooting Range in Port Moresby, Papua New Guinea. Tahiti and Fiji were the most successful nations, winning three gold medals each. Medals were initially awarded for teams in the pistol shooting section, but as team events for pistols were not included in the official schedule those medals were withdrawn.

Medal summary

Medal table

Pistol results
Five pistol events were hosted at the indoor shooting range. All were for individual shooters only, no team medals were on offer. The 10 metre air pistol was  held as separate men's and women's competitions. The 25 metre standard pistol event was open to both men and women (i.e. not gender specific). There were two events for the 25 metre pistol (also known as the sport pistol) – one open, and one for women shooters only.

Shotgun results
Six clay target events were held on the down-the-line shotgun range, contested within three disciplines; double barrel (also known as single rise), single barrel, and points score. Medals were awarded for both individual and team events in each discipline. The shotgun competition was not gender specific, with all events open to men and women.

Participating nations
There were eight countries competing:

Notes

References
 

2015 Pacific Games
Pacific Games
2015